Thomas Hearns vs. Iran Barkley II, billed as Bombs Away, was a professional boxing match contested on March 20, 1992 for the WBA light heavyweight title.

Background
In June 1991, Thomas Hearns had upset the previously undefeated Virgil Hill to capture the WBA light heavyweight title, giving the 32-year old Hearns, his sixth and final world title. For his next fight, Hearns had initially planned to move up to the cruiserweight division to challenge then-WBA cruiserweight champion Bobby Czyz in an effort to become the first fighter to win world titles in six different weight divisions. However, when Hearns reportedly demanded no less than a $10 million purse to fight Czyz, the fight fell through. James Warring, the then-IBF cruiserweight champion was also suggested as an opponent, but Hearns rejected that fight as well, claiming that he didn't want to move up to cruiserweight. Instead, Hearns agreed to defend his light heavyweight title against Iran Barkley in what was a rematch of their 1988 fight in which Barkley defeated Hearns by knockout in the third round.

Barkley, who had struggled after his victory over Hearns, was just coming off a big victory over Darrin Van Horn that saw him knock out Van Horn in the second round to capture the IBF super middleweight title.

The fight
The fight was closely contested with Barkley picking up his second victory over Hearns via a close split decision. Barkley would score the fight's only knockdown, sending Hearns down after countering a Hearns right with a left hook. Though Hearns would quickly get back up, the point Hearns lost from the knockdown would loom large as the end result would have resulted in a draw and Hearns would have retained his title. Barkley was the aggressor for much of the fight, throwing 904 punches of which he landed 224, only slightly more than Hearns who landed 217 of his 578 punches for a 38% success rate, much higher than Barkley who only landed 25% of his thrown punches. By the end of the fight, both of Barkley's eyes were nearly swollen shut while Hearns was almost unrecognizable as both his nose and left cheek had swollen considerably. Hearns was named the winner on one scorecard 114–113, while Barkley took the other scorecards with scores of 115–113 and 114–113. When asked of the decision Hearns replied "It could've gone either way."

Fight card

References

1992 in boxing
Boxing matches
1992 in sports in Nevada
Boxing on HBO
Boxing in Las Vegas
March 1992 sports events in the United States